Paddock to Plate is an Australian television series starring Matt Moran. It premiered on LifeStyle on 6 November 2013. A second series was announced in February 2014 and began airing on 3 September.

The series won ASTRA Awards for Most Outstanding Lifestyle Program in 2014 and 2015. It was nominated for Best Light Entertainment Television Series at the 4th AACTA Awards.

Episodes

Series 1 (2013–14)

Series 2 (2014)

References

External links

2013 Australian television series debuts
2014 Australian television series endings
Australian non-fiction television series
Lifestyle (Australian TV channel) original programming